Craig Barrett may refer to:

 Craig Barrett (racewalker) (born 1971), New Zealand racewalker
 Craig Barrett (chief executive) (born 1939), American business executive

See also
 Craig H. Barratt (born 1962), Australian technology executive
 Craig Braham-Barrett (born 1988), English footballer